Ukrainian Democratic Party (UDP), was a Ukrainian party that existed in Kiev in since 1897 first as a clandestine General Ukrainian nonpartisan democratic organization that grew into a political party just before the 1905 Russian revolution. The 1897 organization was formed out of the already existing wider community organization network known as Hromada (Community) that existed since 1859 and the Taras Student Fraternity, a more direct student organization of 1891.

Name change
General Ukrainian Unaffiliated Democratic Organization (1897 - 1904)
Ukrainian Democratic Party (1904 - 1905)
Ukrainian Radical Party (1904 - 1905)
Ukrainian Democratic Radical Party (1905 - 1908)
Society of Ukrainian Progressionists (1908 - 1917)
Ukrainian Party of Socialists-Federalists (1917 - 1923)
Ukrainian Radical Democratic Party (1923 - 1939)

General Ukrainian Nonpartisan Democratic Organization
The party was formed out of the General Ukrainian Organization, also known as General Ukrainian Nonpartisan Democratic Organization. The organization was formed also in Kiev earlier in 1897 by the Ukrainized Polish political activist Volodymyr Antonovych and the Ukrainian lexicographer Oleksandr Konysky.

That organization united all Hromadas from some 20 cities across the Ukrainian lands. The organization published the magazine Vik, organized the Shevchenko's festivals, and provided political sanctuary for the politically persecuted national activists.

First years and Split
The UDP was seeking liquidation of absolutism in the Russian Empire and the introduction of a constitutional order (similarly to the Russian Kadets). The party also was pursuing an autonomy for the Ukrainian lands with its own regional diet (sejm) and implementation of the Ukrainian language throughout the territory. Among its early leaders were Serhiy Yefremov, Borys Hrinchenko, Yevhen Chykalenko. 
At the end of 1904 a left-inclined group of its party members split into another political party, the Ukrainian Radical Party. Unlike the democrats, the Ukrainian radicals were for the constitutional monarchy. Among the radicals were the above-mentioned Serhiy Yefremov, Borys Hrinchenko as well as Modest Levytsky, Fedir Matushevsky, and others. The party published its periodicals in Lviv and Saint Petersburg. It did not manage to create much of influence on the local population in Ukraine and in the autumn of 1905 reunited back with democrats into the Ukrainian Democratic Radical Party (UDRP).

UDRP
The fundamental principals of the party were parliamentarism and federalism: Ukraine had to acquire under the Constitution of Russia a wide degree of autonomy. UDRP also was seeking a compulsory purchase from private owners its land and industries that eventually would be nationalized. The party was represented in the State Duma of the Russian Empire in its first two convocations. The State Duma UDRP parliamentarians organized into the Duma's Ukrainian Hromada. During this period the party published its own press media Hromada's Thought which was a predecessor of the newspaper Rada. With early dissolution of the Second State Duma and the growing Russian nationalism on the Ukrainian territory (see Pogroms), the party reorganized into the Society of Ukrainian Progressionists (TUP) together with some members of the Ukrainian Social Democratic Labour Party.

References

External links
 Society of Ukrainian Progressives. Encyclopedia of Ukraine

Political parties established in 1904
Political parties of the Russian Revolution
Political parties disestablished in 1939
Ukrainian political parties in Imperial Russia
Defunct socialist parties in Ukraine